Alastair Murray Cutting (born 29 May 1960) is a British Church of England priest. Since 2013, he has served as the Archdeacon of Lewisham & Greenwich in the Diocese of Southwark.

Early life and education
Cutting was born on 29 May 1960 in Birmingham, England, the son of William Alexander Murray Cutting and his wife, Margaret McLean Cutting, née Manderson. He was educated in three different countries: at George Watson's College, a private school in Edinburgh, Scotland; at Lushington Boys School, a private international Christian school in Ootacamund, India; and at Watford Grammar School for Boys, a state comprehensive school in Watford, England. He grew up in South India where his parents worked at a rural hospital and "where four generations of his family lived and worked for nearly a century".

Cutting took a gap year between school and university, during which he worked with the Salvation Army in South India. He then returned to England, where he studied teaching and youth work at Westhill College, University of Birmingham. He graduated in 1983 with a Bachelor of Education (BEd) degree. From 1983 to 1984, he worked as a science laboratory technician at a school. In 1984, he entered St John's College, Nottingham, an Open Evangelical Anglican theological college to study theology and train for ordination. During this time, he completed a Licentiate of Theology (LTh) degree and a Diploma in Pastoral Studies (DPS).

While undertaking parish ministry in the Diocese of Chichester, Cutting studied at Heythrop College, University of London. He graduated with a Master of Arts (MA) degree in 2003. His master's thesis concerned Maori and Celtic spirituality.

Ordained ministry
Cutting was ordained in the Church of England as a deacon in 1987 and as a priest in 1988. He served his curacy in the Diocese of Sheffield at All Saints Church, Woodlands from 1987 to 1988, and then at Wadsley Parish Church from 1989 to 1991. From 1991 to 1996, he was Chaplain to The Nave and Uxbridge Town Centre, and an assistant curate in the Uxbridge Team Ministry in the Diocese of London.

In 1996, Cutting moved to the Diocese of Chichester where he took up his first incumbency as Vicar of St John the Evangelist, Copthorne, West Sussex. After 14 years, in 2010, he moved parishes and became Rector of the Benefice of St Peter's Church, Henfield with Shermanbury and Woodmancote, West Sussex. In 2011, he was elected Pro-Prolocutor of the Province of Canterbury of the General Synod in addition to his parish ministry.

In December 2012, he was announced as the next Archdeacon of Lewisham & Greenwich in the Diocese of Southwark. On 14 April 2013, he was instituted and installed as archdeacon during a service at Southwark Cathedral. The Archdeaconry of Lewisham & Greenwich covers the area deaneries of Lewisham, East Lewisham, Charlton, Eltham and Mottingham, Plumstead, West Lewisham, and Deptford. He has also been priest-in-charge of Holy Trinity with St Augustine, Sydenham since 2015.

Views
Cutting is an Evangelical Anglican, and is a Member of the Church of England Evangelical Council.

Personal life
In 1984, Cutting married Kay Elizabeth Greenhalgh. Together they have two daughters.

References

1960 births
Living people
Archdeacons of Lewisham
People from Birmingham, West Midlands
People educated at George Watson's College
Hebron School alumni
People educated at Watford Grammar School for Boys
Alumni of the University of Birmingham
Alumni of St John's College, Nottingham
Alumni of Heythrop College
Evangelical Anglicans
People from Copthorne, West Sussex